Faizullah, also spelled Fayzullah or Feizollah is a male Muslim given name, composed of the elements Faiz and Allah. It means Success from God or Victory from God. In modern usage it may appear as a surname. Notable people with the name include:

Males
 Faizullah Khan (c. 1730–1793), Nawab of Rampur (India)
 Fayzulla Khodzhayev (1896–1938), Uzbek politician
 Feizollah Nasseri (born 1955), Iranian weightlifter
 Muhammad Faizullah (1892–1976), Bangladeshi Islamic scholar and poet
 Sajjad Feizollahi (born 1987), Iranian footballer
 Faizullah (Taliban leader), allegedly sent 300 fighters to Afghanistan in 2003

Females
Shovkat Feyzulla qizi Alakbarova, or just Shovkat Alakbarova, (1922–1993), Azerbaijani singer

Arabic masculine given names